In March 2012, one of the greatest heat waves was observed in many regions of North America.  Very warm air pushed northward west of the Great Lakes region, and subsequently spread eastward. The intense poleward air mass movement was propelled by an unusually intense low level southerly jet that stretched from Louisiana to western Wisconsin. Once this warm surge inundated the area, a remarkably prolonged period of record setting temperatures ensued.

NOAA's National Climate Data Center reported that over 7,000 daily record high temperatures were tied or broken from 1 March through 27 March. In some places the temperature exceeded . Records were broken in unusual ways. Chicago, for example, saw temperatures above  every day between March 14–18, breaking records on all five days. Chicago would go on to record eight days at or above 80 °F during the month, with many suburban areas recording an additional day in the 80s on March 19 (that day, the city only tied its record high of ). In context, the National Weather Service's Chicago branch noted that Chicago typically averages only one day in the 80's in April. And only once in 140 years of weather observations has April produced as many 80 °F days as this March. 

Temperature records across much of southern Canada also were shattered. That same day, the temperature hit  at Western Head, Nova Scotia. The week of March 18 also set record temperatures in Manitoba and much of Ontario as well as into the Maritime Provinces. Non-severe thunderstorms were reported on the evening hours of March 21, through to the early morning hours March 22 into northern Ontario.

In addition, NCEP/NCAR Reanalysis data show that the atmospheric pattern was so persistent that much of the Midwest and Northeast, and up into Ontario, had temperature departures over periods of several days to a week or more of magnitudes which would be unusual even for a single day. Averaged over the seven-day period from March 16 to March 22 inclusive, nearly the entire area of the Midwest and Northeast U.S. and most of Ontario and Quebec had temperatures  or more above the 1981-2010 average.

The warm weather was also responsible for several early-season tornado touchdowns, such as the EF3 that struck Dexter, Michigan, near Ann Arbor.

Causes 

A contributing factor to the unprecedented warmth was a warmer than average winter with below-average snowfall across the CONUS, meaning less thermal energy was required to heat the atmosphere.

The primary, immediate cause of the heat wave was a buckled jet stream caused by an abnormally strong high pressure ridge atop the Eastern United States and an unusually strong and slow-moving low pressure trough across the West, which brought with it below-average temperatures and snow. The tight pressure gradient allowed for an intense southerly jet to form, which transported warm, humid air from the Gulf of Mexico northward, with the moisture having an insulating effect during the night. The ridge also deflected storm systems northward away from the Eastern U.S. and kept skies clear, allowing further daytime radiative heating to occur.

In addition, the North Atlantic oscillation was in a strongly positive phase during the heat wave, which often foreshadows above average temperatures in the Eastern U.S. The Madden-Julian oscillation also entered a phase correlated with warm temperatures in the U.S. East.

Continued warmth 

The heat was so strong that Alamosa, Colorado, broke its daily record for six consecutive days. In Galveston, Texas, the earliest  day ever was recorded, on June 25.

Thousands of records were being broken again on June 28.

The continued heat following the lack of snow the previous winter was a contributor to the record-shattering 2012 North American drought.

References

External links
www.weather.gov - National Weather Service
Weather Information - Environment Canada
The 2012 Heat Wave: "Almost Like Science Fiction"
U.S. Heat Wave 2012 What's Behind The Hot Weather
NASA image shows U.S. heat wave that turned winter to summer

2012 heat waves
2012 03
2012 03
2012 disasters in Canada
March 2012 events in Canada